was a Japanese photographer and one of Japan's pioneers in photojournalism.
The Selection Committee of Nikon Salon established the Miki Jun Award in 1999 to remember his legacy.

Books showing Miki's works
Dokyumentarī no jidai: Natori Yōnosuke, Kimura Ihee, Domon Ken, Miki Jun no shashin kara / The Documentary Age: Photographs by Natori Younosuke, Kimura Ihee, Domon Ken, and Miki Jun. Tokyo: Tokyo Metropolitan Museum of Photography, 2001. An exhibition catalogue. Captions in both Japanese and English, other text in Japanese only.

Notes

Japanese photographers
1919 births
1992 deaths
People from Kurashiki